Natalia L. Komarova (born 1971) is a Russian-American applied mathematician whose research concerns the mathematical modeling of cancer, the evolution of language, gun control, pop music, and other complex systems. She is a Chancellor's Professor of Mathematics at the University of California, Irvine.

Education and career
Komarova studied physics at Moscow State University, earning a master's degree there in 1993. She completed her Ph.D. in 1998 at the University of Arizona. Her dissertation, Essays on Nonlinear Waves: Patterns under Water; Pulse Propagation through Random Media, was supervised by Alan C. Newell.

After postdoctoral research at the University of Warwick, the Institute for Advanced Study, and the University of Chicago, Komarova became a lecturer at the University of Leeds in 2000. She moved to Rutgers University in 2003 and to the University of California, Irvine in 2004. At UC Irvine, she was named a Chancellor's Professor in 2017.

Recognition
Komarova won a Sloan Research Fellowship in 2005.

Books
Komarova is married to UC Irvine evolutionary biologist Dominik Wodarz. She has written three books with Wodarz:
Computational Biology of Cancer: Lecture Notes and Mathematical Modeling (World Scientific, 2005)
Dynamics Of Cancer: Mathematical Foundations Of Oncology (World Scientific, 2014)
Targeted Cancer Treatment in Silico: Small Molecule Inhibitors and Oncolytic Viruses (Birkhäuser, 2014)

References

External links
Home page

Living people
21st-century American mathematicians
American women mathematicians
Russian mathematicians
Moscow State University alumni
University of Arizona alumni
Academics of the University of Leeds
Rutgers University faculty
University of California, Irvine faculty
Sloan Research Fellows
1971 births
21st-century American women